Samuel Joseph Corcoran (born 5 February 1991) is an English footballer who plays for Southern League Premier Central side Hendon, where he plays as a midfielder.

Playing career

Colchester United
Corcoran was first involved with the Colchester United first team after being named on the bench for a League One game against Millwall on 31 March 2009, while he was in the second year of his scholarship. He made his debut for Colchester after coming on as an 89th minute substitute in a 2–0 victory over Hereford United. Following this match, he drew praise from manager Paul Lambert, who said he hoped Corcoran would become a regular player in the team.

On 4 December 2009 he joined Wealdstone on a month's loan.
Which was later extended by a further month. On 18 May 2010 Corcoran was released by Colchester. However, after John Ward was announced as Colchester manager on 31 May 2010 Corcoran was offered a new 1-year contract. On 10 March 2011 Corcoran was loaned out to Isthmian League Premier Division side Lowestoft Town for one month. He was recalled on 6 April.

On 28 April Colchester announced that he would be one of three players who would be released at the end of the season.

Chelmsford City
He signed for Chelmsford City before the start of the 2011–12 season.

On 20 November 2012, video footage of Corcoran's free kick in a game against Hayes & Yeading United in the Conference South went viral as he slipped before kicking the ball, allowing Hayes and Yeading possession and leading them to score and win the game 3–0. It was described in media coverage as the "worst free kick ever". Corcoran took the coverage in good humour, claiming on his Twitter account that the free kick was a "stinker" and that he was a "youtube sensation for all the wrong reasons".

Hayes & Yeading United
Corcoran was released by Chelmsford City on 2 February 2013. Within a fortnight he signed for Hayes & Yeading United, the very team against which he had suffered his free kick misfortune. He made his debut on 16 February 2013 against Farnborough, having been substituted on for Pelé. Hayes and Yeading lost the match 4–1.

St Albans City
On 31 January 2014 it was announced that Corcoran had been training with St Albans City for the past 8 weeks in a bid to regain fitness but a broken foot means his debut will have to wait until March

A.F.C. Sudbury
Sam joined A.F.C. Sudbury on 20 March 2017.

Royston Town
On 17 July 2017, Corcoran was one of three players signed by Southern League Premier Division side Royston Town, he was joined by James Potton and Lee Chappell.

Hendon
In July 2019, Corcoran joined Hendon FC.

Career statistics

Club

Does not include Football League Trophy appearances.

References

External links

Sam Corcoran at Aylesbury United

1991 births
Living people
English footballers
Association football midfielders
Arsenal F.C. players
Colchester United F.C. players
Lowestoft Town F.C. players
Wealdstone F.C. players
Chelmsford City F.C. players
Hayes & Yeading United F.C. players
St Albans City F.C. players
Hemel Hempstead Town F.C. players
A.F.C. Sudbury players
Royston Town F.C. players
Hendon F.C. players
English Football League players
Isthmian League players
National League (English football) players